Craig Thomas Coolahan (born November 16, 1970) is a Canadian politician who was elected in the 2015 Alberta general election to the Legislative Assembly of Alberta representing the electoral district of Calgary-Klein.

Coolahan was born in Toronto to parents Thomas and Suzanne and grew up in the suburb of Scarborough. He has one brother, Christopher, and they both attended Hunter's Glen Public School, Charles Gordon Junior High, and David and Mary Thomson High School.

After high school he worked at an insurance company in Toronto for a few years and returned to school in 1993.  He attended Okanagan University College (now UBC Okanagan) and achieved an Bachelor of Arts degree in English from UBC in conjunction with OUC.  In 2001 he completed a Bachelor of Journalism Degree from University College of the Cariboo in Kamloops (now Thompson Rivers University).

Coolahan spent several years as a writer and editor in many capacities, including 10 years as a technical writer.  He also wrote for newspapers, magazines and co-wrote two vocational how-to books.

In 2012, Coolahan left writing and editing and became a Business Agent for the United Utilities Workers' Association.

After moving to Calgary in 2003, he became politically active on issues such as health care, education and housing.

He ran for the Alberta NDP in the 2012 provincial general election in the riding of Calgary-Elbow, losing to the would-be Premier Alison Redford.

He ran again in 2015, winning the seat for Calgary-Klein, when the provincial NDP swept to a majority.

Coolahan married Sarah Somasundaram in 2010 and they have two children: Mehna Grace (b.2011) and Kieran Shanta Thomas (b.2014).  They live in Calgary in the neighbourhood of Capitol Hill.

As a backbench MLA, Coolahan introduced several bills. In November 2016 he introduced Bill 208 to "introduce mandatory workplace harassment policies for every industry,"  and while the bill died after its first reading it informed the NDP government's "An Act to Protect The Health and Well-Being of Working Albertans" which became law in June 2018. In 2018, Coolahan introduced Bill 206: Preventing the Promotion of Hate Amendment Act to "give the registrar of Alberta Societies within Service Alberta power to look at whether a group has a lawful purpose" when it registers to become a legally recognized organization with certain rights in Alberta. It also died after its first reading.

Electoral record

References

Alberta New Democratic Party MLAs
Living people
Politicians from Calgary
Politicians from Toronto
21st-century Canadian politicians
1970 births